Daniel Stanley Ryczek (born August 24, 1949) is a former American football offensive lineman in the National Football League for the Washington Redskins, the Tampa Bay Buccaneers, and the Los Angeles Rams, his last game was playing for the LA Rams in Super Bowl XIV.

Football career
Ryczek played at Mentor High School in Ohio.  He played college football at the University of Virginia, where he was the 1970 co-captain and received the 1970 Jacobs Blocking Trophy as the best blocking offensive lineman. Ryczek was drafted in the thirteenth round of the 1971 NFL Draft by the Washington Redskins and Head Coach George Allen. In the Expansion draft in 1976, he was selected by the new Tampa Bay Buccaneers. In 1978, he was traded to the Los Angeles Rams, back to George Allen, the new head coach or the Rams.

His brother Paul also played for Virginia and in the NFL.

References

1949 births
Living people
People from Mentor, Ohio
Players of American football from Ohio
Sportspeople from Greater Cleveland
American football centers
Virginia Cavaliers football players
Washington Redskins players
Tampa Bay Buccaneers players
Los Angeles Rams players
Mentor High School alumni